Keel is a village on Achill Island in County Mayo, Ireland.

Transport and access
Keel is located on the R319 regional road. Bus Éireann route 440 (Dooagh-Westport-Ireland West Airport Knock passes through Keel once a day in each direction on weekdays. Expressway route 52 provides an evening journey each way to/from Westport and Galway.

See also
 List of towns in the Republic of Ireland

References

Towns and villages in County Mayo
Villages in Achill Island